This is a list of notable events in music that took place in the year 1910.

Specific locations
1910 in Norwegian music

Specific genres
1910 in jazz

Events
February 19 - English premiere of Richard Strauss's opera Elektra, Thomas Beecham conducting at the first-ever performance of a Strauss opera in the UK at the Royal Opera House, London
March 19 – Béla Bartók's String Quartet No. 1 is premiered in Budapest
June 25 – Igor Stravinsky's ballet, The Firebird, is premiered in Paris
September 12 – Gustav Mahler's Symphony No. 8, the Symphony of a Thousand, is premiered in Munich under his baton.
October – Pietro Mascagni and Giacomo Puccini make up after their 1905 quarrel
November – John Lomax's pioneering collection Cowboy Songs and Other Frontier Ballads is published by Sturgis and Walton in the United States with an introduction by Theodore Roosevelt
November 7 – The musical comedy, Naughty Marietta, with music by Victor Herbert, is first performed on Broadway
November 10 – Edward Elgar conducts the premiere of his Violin Concerto, with Fritz Kreisler playing the solo part
Mary Garden begins her 20-year reign as soprano of the Chicago Civic Opera

Published popular music
 "Ah! Sweet Mystery Of Life" w. Rida Johnson Young m. Victor Herbert.  From the operetta Naughty Marietta
 "Alexander and His Clarinet" w. Irving Berlin m. Ted Snyder
 "All Aboard For Blanket Bay" w. Andrew B. Sterling m. Harry Von Tilzer
 "All That I Ask Of You Is Love" w. Edgar Selden m. Herbert Ingraham
 "Angels" w.m. Irving Berlin
 "Any Little Girl, That's a Nice Little Girl, is the Right Little Girl For Me" w. Thomas J. Gray m. Fred Fisher
 "Back To My Old Home Town" w.m. Nora Bayes & Jack Norworth
 "A Banjo Song" by Howard Weeden
 "The Big Bass Viol" w.m. M. T. Bohannon
 "The Birth of Passion" w. Otto Harbach m. Karl Hoschna.  From the musical Madame Sherry.
 "Bring Back My Lena To Me" w.m. Irving Berlin & David Andrew Noll
 "By The Saskatchewan" w. C. M. S. McLellan m. Ivan Caryll
 "Call Me Up Some Rainy Afternoon" w.m. Irving Berlin
 "Caprice Viennois" m. Fritz Kreisler
 "The Chanticleer Rag" w. Edward Madden m. Albert Gumble
 "The Chicken Reel" m. Joseph M. Daly
 "Chinatown, My Chinatown" w. William Jerome m. Jean Schwartz
 "Cloud-Chief" m. J. Ernest Philie.
 "Come Josephine In My Flying Machine" w. Alfred Bryan m. Fred Fisher
 "Come To The Ball" w. Adrian Ross m. Lionel Monckton
 "Constantly" w. Chris Smith m. James Henry Burris
 "The Convict And The Bird" w.m. T. W. Connor
 "Day Dreams, Visions Of Bliss" w. Harry B. Smith & Robert B. Smith m. Heinrich Reinhardt
 "Dear Mayme, I Love You!" Irving Berlin and Ted Snyder
 "Doctor Tinkle Tinker" by Otto Harbach
 "Don't Wake Me Up, I'm Dreaming" w. Beth Slater Whitson m. Herbert Ingraham
 "Down By The Old Mill Stream" w.m. Tell Taylor
 "Dream of a Miner's Child" ("Don't Go down in the Mine, Dad") w. Robert Donnely, Will Geddes
 "Dreams, Just Dreams" Irving Berlin & Ted Snyder
 "Every Little Movement" w. Otto Harbach m. Karl Hoschna
 "Gee But It's Great To Meet A Friend From Your Old Home Town" w. William Tracey m. James Mc Gavisk
 "Goodbye Rose" w. Addison Burkhart m. Herbert Ingraham
 "Grizzly Bear" w.m. George Botsford & Irving Berlin
 "Hennessy" w.m. T.W. Connor w.m. Herman E. Darewski Jr.
 "Herman Let's Dance That Beautiful Waltz" Irving Berlin & Ted Snyder
 "How Can You Love Such A Man?" Irving Berlin
 "I Feel So Lonely" w.m. Bert Lee.  Introduced by Fred Allandale in the musical The Islander (musical)
 "I'd Love To Live In Loveland" w.m. W. R. Williams (Rossiter)
 "If He Comes In I'm Going Out" w. Cecil Mack m. Chris Smith
 "If I Was A Millionaire" w. Will D. Cobb m. Gus Edwards
 "I'm Falling In Love With Someone" w. Rida Johnson Young m. Victor Herbert
 "I'm Henery the Eighth" w.m. Fred Murray & R. P. Weston
 "In The Shadows" w. E. Ray Goetz m. Herman Finck
 "Is There Anything Else I Can Do For You?" w.m. Irving Berlin & Ted Snyder
 "Italian Street Song" w. Rida Johnson Young m. Victor Herbert
 "I've Got The Time I've Got The Place But It's Hard To Find The Girl" w. Ballard MacDonald m. S. R. Henry
 "Joshua" w.m George Arthurs & Bert Lee
 "Kiss Me, My Honey, Kiss Me" w. Irving Berlin m. Ted Snyder
 "Let Me Call You Sweetheart" w. Beth Slater Whitson m. Leo Friedman
 "Let Me Live And Stay In Dixieland" w.m. Elizabeth Brice & Charles King
 "Liebesfreud" m. Fritz Kreisler
 "Liebeslied" m. Fritz Kreisler
 "Life Is Only What You Make It After All" w. Edgar Smith m. A. Baldwin Sloane
 "Macushla" w. Josephine V. Rowe m. Dermot MacMurrough

 "Maiden with the Dreamy Eyes" w. J. W. Johnson m. Bob Cole
 "Morning" w. Frank Lebby Stanton m. Oley Speaks
 "Mother Machree" w. Rida Johnson Young m. Ernest R. Ball & Chauncey Olcott
 "'Neath The Southern Moon" w. Rida Johnson Young m. Victor Herbert.  From the operetta Naughty Marietta.
 "Nora Malone" w. Junie McCree m. Albert Von Tilzer
 "Oh How That German Could Love" w.m. Irving Berlin & Ted Snyder
 "Oh That Beautiful Rag" w. Irving Berlin m. Ted Snyder
 "On Mobile Bay" w. Earl C. Jones m. Neil Moret
 "A Perfect Day" w.m. Carrie Jacobs-Bond
 "Plant A Watermelon On My Grave And Let The Juice Soak Through" w.m. Frank Dumont & R. P. Lilly
 "Play That Barbershop Chord" w. Ballard MacDonald & William Tracey m. Lewis F. Muir
 "Put On Your Ta-Ta Little Girlie" w.m. Fred Leigh
 "Put Your Arms Around Me Honey" w. Junie McCree m. Harry Von Tilzer
 "Red Pepper: A Spicy Rag" m. Henry Lodge
 "Silver Bell" w. Edward Madden  m. Percy Wenrich
 "Silver Star" m. Charles L. Johnson
 "Some Of These Days" w.m. Shelton Brooks

 "Spaghetti Rag" m. George Lyons & Bob Yosco
 "Steamboat Bill" w. Ren Shields m. Bert Leighton & Frank Leighton
 "Stein Song (Maine)" w. Lincoln Colcord m. E. A. Fenstad
 "Stop, Stop, Stop (Come Over And Love Me Some More)" w.m. Irving Berlin
 "Sweet Italian Love" Irving Berlin, Ted Snyder
 "Tambourin Chinois" m. Fritz Kreisler
 "Telling Lies" Irving Berlin, Henrietta Blanke-Belcher
 "That Minor Strain" w. Cecil Mack m. Ford Dabney
 "That Opera Rag" Irving Berlin, Ted Snyder
 "That's Why They Call Me "Shine"" w. Cecil Mack m. Ford Dabney
 "Tramp! Tramp! Tramp!" w. Rida Johnson Young m. Victor Herbert
 "Two Little Love Bees" w. Harry B. Smith & Robert B. Smith m. Heinrich Reinhardt
 "Under The Yum Yum Tree" w. Andrew B. Sterling m. Harry Von Tilzer
 "Vissi D'Arte" Giacossa, Illica, Puccini
 "Washington And Lee Swing" w. Thornton W. Allen & C. A. Robbins m. Thornton W. Allen & M. W. Sheafe
 "What's The Matter With Father?" w. Harry H. Williams m. Egbert Van Alstyne
 "Who Are You With Tonight?" w. Harry Williams m. Egbert Van Alstyne
 "You Are The Ideal Of My Dreams" w.m. Herbert Ingraham

Hit recordings
 "Come Josephine In My Flying Machine" – Blanche Ring

Classical music
Alban Berg - String Quartet, Op. 3
Rutland Boughton – Five Celtic Songs
Claude Debussy - Préludes (book 1 begun in 1910)
Edward Elgar - 
Violin Concerto, Op. 61
Romance for bassoon, Op. 62
Victor Ewald – Symphony for Brass 
Gabriel Fauré –  (completed in this year)
Charles Ives - Symphony No. 3 (1908-1910)
Gustav Mahler – Symphony No. 9
Erkki Melartin – String Quartet No. 4
Nikolai Myaskovsky – 
Symphonic poem Silence
String Quartet No. 3 (original version)
Carl Nielsen – 
At the Bier of a Young Artist (orchestral work for funeral)
Paaske-Liljen (choral work)
Sinfonia espansiva, Op. 27 / FS 60  (begun, concluded 1911)
Sergei Rachmaninoff
Liturgy of St John Chrysostom, Op. 31
13 Preludes, Op. 32
Arnold Schoenberg – Five Pieces for Orchestra
Alexander Scriabin – Prometheus, "The Poem of Fire"
Jean Sibelius - In Memoriam, Op. 59 (completed)
Igor Stravinsky – The Firebird
Ralph Vaughan Williams
Fantasia on a Theme by Thomas Tallis (first version)
Symphony No. 1 ("A Sea Symphony")
Anton Webern –

Incidental music
Carl Nielsen - Hagbarth og Signe

Opera
Gialdino Gialdini – La Bufera premiered November 26 at the Politeama Ciscutti, Pola
Jules Massenet – Don Quichotte premiered February 19 in Monte Carlo, starring Feodor Chaliapin
Alexander Zemlinsky – Kleider machen Leute

Ballet
June 25 – Igor Stravinsky's ballet, The Firebird, is premiered in Paris

Musical theatre

 The Balkan Princess London production opened at the Prince of Wales Theatre on February 19 and ran for 176 performances
 The Chocolate Soldier (Rudolf Friml) – London production opened at the Lyric Theatre on September 10 and ran for 500 performances
 The Islander London production opened at the Apollo Theatre on April 23 and ran for 114 performances
 The Jolly Bachelors Broadway production opened at the Broadway Theatre on January 6 and ran for 165 performances
 Die keusche Susanne (m. Jean Gilbert) opened in Magdeburg
 Madame Sherry Broadway production opened at the New Amsterdam Theatre on August 30 and ran for 231 performances
 Naughty Marietta (Rida Johnson Young and Victor Herbert) – Broadway production opened at the New York Theatre on November 7 and ran for 136 performances
 Our Miss Gibbs Broadway production opened at the Knickerbocker Theatre on August 29 and ran for 64 performances
 The Quaker Girl (Music: Lionel Monckton Lyrics: Adrian Ross & Percy Greenbank  Book: James T. Tanner).  London production opened at the Adelphi Theatre on November 5 and ran for 536 performances.  Starring Gertie Millar, Joseph Coyne and C. Hayden Coffin.
 The Satyr London production
 Tillie's Nightmare Broadway production opened at the Herald Square Theatre on May 5 and was revived at the Manhattan Opera House on December 18, 1911, for a total run of 85 performances
 Up and Down Broadway Broadway revue opened at the Casino Theatre on July 18 and ran for 72 performances
 The Yankee Girl Broadway production opened at the Herald Square Theatre on February 10 and ran for 92 performances
 Zigeunerliebe Vienna production opened at the Carltheater on January 8

Births
January 1 – Koesbini, Indonesian composer (d. 1991)
January 8 – Fabian Andre, composer (d. 1960)
January 23 – Django Reinhardt, guitarist (d. 1953)
February 3 – Blas Galindo Dimas, Mexican composer (d. 1993?)
February 25 – Winifred Shaw, US actress, singer and dancer (d. 1982)
March 9 – Samuel Barber, composer (d. 1981)
March 11 – Nicola Salerno, Italian lyricist (d. 1969)
March 15 – Anna-Lisa Björling, operatic soprano (d. 2006)
 March 25 – Magda Olivero, Italian soprano (d. 2014)
March 27 – Manfred Bukofzer, German-American musicologist (d. 1955)
April 14 – Werner Wolf Glaser, Swiss composer (d. 2006)
April 26 – Erland von Koch, Swedish composer (d. 2009)
April 30 – Levi Celerio, songwriter (d. 2002)
May 8 – Mary Lou Williams, US jazz pianist and composer (d. 1981)
May 12
Gordon Jenkins, US songwriter, conductor and pianist (d. 1984)
Giulietta Simionato, Italian mezzo-soprano (d. 2010)
May 13 – Cleavant Derricks, gospel songwriter (d. 1977)
May 23
Artie Shaw, US bandleader (d. 2004)
Scatman Crothers, American actor, singer, dancer and musician (d. 1986)
May 26 – Lola Gjoka, Albanian pianist (d. 1985)
May 28 – T. Bone Walker, blues musician (d. 1975)
June 4 – Anton Dermota, operatic tenor (d. 1989)
June 10 – Howlin' Wolf, blues singer and musician (d. 1976)
June 15 – Alf Pearson, British singer, part of Bob and Alf Pearson (d. 2012)
June 17 – H. Owen Reed, conductor and composer (d. 2014)
June 18 – Ray McKinley, US drummer, singer and bandleader (d. 1995)
June 22 – Anne Ziegler, English soprano (d. 2003)
June 29 – Frank Loesser, US songwriter (d. 1969)
July 10 – Rafael Cepeda, folk musician (d. 1996)
July 15 – Ronald Binge, British composer (d.1973)
July 18 – Lou Busch, US arranger and composer a.k.a. Joe "Fingers" Carr (died 1979)
August 1 – Walter Scharf, film composer (died 2003)
August 7 – Freddie Slack, US pianist, composer and bandleader (d. 1965)
August 12 – Heinrich Sutermeister, Swiss composer (d. 1995)
August 17 – Erkki Aaltonen, composer (d. 1990)
August 24 – Tunde King, Nigerian singer and instrumentalist, originator of Jùjú music (d. c.1980)
August 25 – Ethel Stark, violinist and composer (d. 2012)
September 3 – Kitty Carlisle, US actress and singer (d. 2007)
September 12 – Shep Fields, bandleader (d. 1981)
September 29 – Virginia Bruce, actress and singer (d. 1982)
October 1 – André Dumortier, pianist (d. 2004)
October 13 – Otto Joachim, composer (d. 2010)
December 4 – Alex North, film composer (d. 1991)
December 7 – Louis Prima, musician, singer (d. 1978)
December 10 – John H. Hammond, record producer (d. 1987)
date unknown – Takahashi Chikuzan, Japanese musician and composer (d. 1998)

Deaths
January 19 – Otakar Hostinský, musicologist (b. 1847)
March 10 – Carl Reinecke, composer, pianist and teacher (b. 1824)
March 17 – Joaquín Valverde Durán, flautist, conductor and composer (b. 1846)
March 28 – Édouard Colonne, violinist and conductor (b. 1838)
May 3 – Lottie Collins, singer and dancer (b. 1865)
May 7 – Bernhard Cossmann, cellist (b. 1822)
May 18
Pauline Viardot, mezzo-soprano and composer (b. 1821)
Flor van Duyse, Belgian composer and musicologist (b. 1843)
May 29 – Mily Balakirev, composer (b. 1837)
June 6 – Concepció Bordalba, opera singer (b. 1866)
July 4 – Louis-Albert Bourgault-Ducoudray, pianist and composer (b. 1840)
July 7 – Emilio Usiglio, conductor and composer (b. 1841)
July 14 – Marius Petipa, ballet dancer and choreographer (b. 1818)
August 31 – Emīls Dārziņš, composer, conductor and music critic (b. 1875) (probable suicide)
September 5
Julian Edwards, composer (b. 1855)
Franz Xaver Haberl, musicologist (b. 1840)
September 24 – Rudolf Dellinger, composer (b. 1857)
October 14 – Georges Mathias, composer and pianist (b. 1826)
October 17 – Julia Ward Howe, lyricist of "The Battle Hymn of the Republic" (b. 1819)
November 25 – John Henry Martin, Band instrument manufacturer (b. 1835)
date unknown – Albert Schatz, composer and librettist (b. 1839)

References

External links
 

 
20th century in music
Music by year